"" is the national anthem of East Timor. It was originally adopted when East Timor unilaterally declared its independence from Portugal in 1975. However, this usage would be short-lived, when the country was invaded by Indonesia. It was officially re-adopted when the independence of East Timor was finally restored in 2002 following a United Nations intervention.

The music was composed by Afonso Redentor Araújo, and the words were written by the poet Francisco Borja da Costa, who was killed by Indonesian forces at the time of the invasion. It was originally sung exclusively in Portuguese, however there is now a Tetum version.

Legislation
The infraconstitutional officialization and the forms of ceremony of uses of the state anthem are regulated by the Law of the National Symbols of Timor-Leste.

Lyrics

Notes

References

External links
Timor Crocodilo Voador - This Brazil-based website about East Timor information includes an .mp3 file of the Full Anthem.
Visit East Timor - Timor-Leste Travel Guide
Timor Leste: Pátria - Audio of the national anthem of Timor Leste, with information and lyrics (archive link)

East Timorese music
National symbols of East Timor
National anthems
Portuguese-language songs
Asian anthems
National anthem compositions in C major